Rohan is a British designer and supplier of outdoor clothing and footwear that has 50 stores and an annual turnover of £30 million. Their products are designed in Milton Keynes, Buckinghamshire and manufactured internationally.

History
The company was founded in 1972 by research chemist Paul Howcroft and his wife Sarah who had met in Scotland. They were both in their early twenties at the time, their start up capital was £70 and they operated from a small house in Skipton, Yorkshire, having chosen that location because of its proximity to West Yorkshire textile mills. Their first product was a pair of quick-drying mountaineering salopettes. 

In 1978, one of their jacket designs was worn by the Austrian climber Peter Habeler on the first climb to the summit of Mount Everest without bottled oxygen. Soon afterwards the lightweight travel range was launched including Rohan Bags that are still in production today. The Howcrofts lost control of the company in the wake of Black Wednesday after a period of decline in the 1980s, and from 1988 it was owned by Clarks until a management buyout. 

In 1993 Paul Howcroft was killed aged 42 in a recreational motoring accident after the couple had separated. The Cann Trust and Colin Fisher took control of the company in 2007 and set about improving the product range and simplifying the management structure. The company was hit by the recession and made an  operating loss in 2009 of £400,000, but that had been turned into a £384,000 operating profit two years later with a turnover of £17.9m. 

In 2016, Rohan Designs Ltd was acquired, in a move to enhance its sports and outdoor business, by H. Young Holdings. The H. Young Group is active in two sectors: automotive and sports and leisure – where it also owns Madison, Animal and Leeda

In November 2020, two of Rohan's 56 stores were permanently closed - partly as a result of the Coronavirus pandemic. The shops in Leeds and Tunbridge Wells had been trading for 21 and 15 years respectively.  In April 2021 a further store became victim of the pandemic with the closure of the Brighton store which at that point had been trading in the area for the past 3 years. In September 2022, the Truro store also closed permanently, having opened as a stand-alone branch back in 2017.

Products
The company has introduced fabrics not previously used for clothing tailored to their own designs. Products include trousers and shirts made from mosquito repellent and UV protection fabrics, thermal fleeces, hats, socks and shoes. The company also introduced a system for rating the suitability of their clothing for different Climate Zones. The clothing has been rated for its practicality rather than stylishness.

References

Outdoor clothing brands
British brands
Clothing companies of the United Kingdom